Cranbourne North is a suburb in Melbourne, Victoria, Australia, 39 km south-east of Melbourne's Central Business District, located within the City of Casey local government area.

Merinda Park railway station is located within the suburb's boundaries. The station is located on the Cranbourne railway line. Merinda Park Railway Station was opened in March 1995, upon completion of the electrification of the line between South Gippsland Highway and the junction with the Pakenham railway line at Dandenong South.

Vic Roads has completed duplication of Thompsons Road between Lesdon Avenue and Narre Warren-Cranbourne Road, which runs the length of the suburb.

Thompson Parkway shopping centre is located on the corner of Thompsons Road and South Gippsland Highway. It was opened in March 1994, and contains a Safeway/Woolworths store, Priceline Chemist, Han's Sushi Bar, Daniel's Donuts and a number of other specialty shops. Cranbourne North Post Office opened here on 21 March 1994.
 
The Cranbourne Homemaker Centre is located just outside the formal boundary of the suburb, which includes Bunnings Warehouse, Spotlight (Formerly Harvey Norman until the early-mid 2010s), Officeworks, The Good Guys, JB Hi-Fi, Beacon Lighting, Autobarn, Red Rooster, Hungry Jack's, EB Games and more. It also included a masters From 2015 until Woolworths permanently closed all Masters stores in 2016.

The Cranbourne Golf Club is located on South Gippsland Highway.

The Camden Green Estate is one of the largest developments in the suburb. Formerly a market garden, construction commenced in 2003. It is alongside Narre Warren – Cranbourne Road.

More recently construction has commenced on the opposite side of Narre Warren – Cranbourne Road on further subdivisions. These include the 'Sierra', 'Eve' and 'The Avenue at Casey' estates. The latter skirts the Melbourne Urban Growth Boundary. Glasscocks Road is currently under construction and will run east–west from Dandenong Valley Highway to Berwick – Cranbourne Road when completed.

Schools

Cranbourne North has two secondary schools, Lyndhurst Secondary College, and Alkira Secondary College, previously known as Casey Central College, and two primary schools; St Theresa's (a Catholic Primary), Courtenay Gardens Primary.

See also
 City of Cranbourne – Cranbourne North was previously within this former local government area.

References

Suburbs of Melbourne
Suburbs of the City of Casey